The Kingdom of Butua or Butwa (c. 1450–1683) was a pre-colonial African state located in what is now southwestern Zimbabwe. Butua was renowned as the source of gold for Arab and Portuguese traders. The region was first mentioned in Portuguese records in 1512.

The kingdom was governed by the Torwa dynasty until 1683 from its capital at Khami. Its people were ancestors of the Shona/Bakalanga. In 1683, the kingdom was conquered by the Rozwi Empire.

The foundations of the Khami Ruins show a striking resemblance to the pattern of masonry at the base of the Zimbabwe Ruins. Hence the Kalanga are thought to have built Khami, Lusvingo, Mapungugwe and other ruins scattered across western Zimbabwe and east Botswana.

Gallery

See also
Torwa dynasty
Rozwi Empire
Naletale

References 

History of Zimbabwe
States and territories disestablished in 1683
Former monarchies of Africa